Subedar Major and Honorary Captain Sundar Singh, AC  (14 February 1929 - 23 January 2017) was an Indian Army officer who was awarded India's highest peace time military decoration Ashoka Chakra. Lance Naik Sunder Singh was a great soldier of 4th Battalion, Jammu & Kashmir Rifles Punjab.

Early life
Subedar Major and Honorary Captain Sunder Singh was born on 14 February 1929 in Chauk Hadan Village of Poonch District, Jammu & Kashmir. His father was Kalyan Singh.

Military career
He was enrolled in the Jammu & Kashmir Infantry in February 1947. He was posted to 4 JAK RIF and retired from his duties as Subedar Major and Honorary Captain. Singh after completion of his training, posted as a soldier in Jammu & Kashmir State Force (after 1957 it became J&K Rifles). In 1952, he was made Acting Lance Naik by his Commanding Officer for his actions in rescuing his family members from Pakistan.

Operation
On 18 March 1956 he was posted with Jammu & Kashmir Rifles at Hussainiwala near Ferozepore. On the night of 18/19 March J&K RIF's unit was attacked by elements of the Pakistani Army. His unit responded with a counterattack and chased them away from the right side of the dam. Other hostile elements then moved into positions at Bela, starting to fire towards the left side of dam with light machine guns. This made it difficult for India to retain the dam and safeguard the troops located there.

Lance Naik Sunder Singh's name was suggested to destroy the position. On being ordered Lance Naik Sunder agreed immediately. Armed with six hand grenades and amidst hostile fire, he crawled one hundred and fifty meters to a rocky area. When he was near to the enemy position, he threw his first grenade which killed three enemies and silenced their guns. He did this three time which allowed Jammu & Kashmir Rifles to possess the right end of dam.

Ashoka Chakra awardee
Lance Naik Sunder Singh showed great presence of mind, courage and total disregard of his safety of the highest order. Without him it had been not possible to achieve the target. For this bravery act he had received “Ashoka Chakra” in 1956.

Death
Singh died on 23 January 2017 in his home village of Chauk Hadan. His death received no official acknowledgement.

References

Indian Army personnel
Ashoka Chakra
1929 births
2017 deaths